Pavone Canavese is a comune (municipality) in the Metropolitan City of Turin in the Italian region Piedmont, located about 45 km northeast of Turin.

Pavone Canavese borders the following municipalities: Ivrea, Banchette, Samone, Colleretto Giacosa, Romano Canavese, Perosa Canavese, San Martino Canavese.

References

External links
 www.comune.pavone.to.it

Cities and towns in Piedmont
Canavese
Wine regions of Italy